Ronald Stuart Veale  is a Canadian jurist and former politician, who represented the electoral district of Riverdale South in the Yukon Legislative Assembly from 1981 to 1982. He was a member of the Yukon Liberal Party, and the party's leader from 1981 to 1984.

Veale assumed the leadership of the Yukon Liberal Party in 1981 after the resignation of Iain MacKay, also running in and winning a by-election on March 9, 1981, to succeed MacKay as MLA for Riverdale South. Under his leadership, however, the party was entirely shut out of the legislature in the 1982 election. Veale resigned the party leadership in 1984, and was succeeded by Roger Coles.

He subsequently returned to his law practice. He was later appointed to the Supreme Court of Yukon, of which he was the Chief Justice until his retirement in July 2020. Veale was appointed to the Order of Yukon in December 2020.

References

1945 births
Living people
Yukon Liberal Party MLAs
Judges in Yukon
Canadian lawyers
Yukon Liberal Party leaders
Members of the Order of Yukon